Profilage is a French television series created by Fanny Robert and Sophie Lebarbier and broadcast since April 23, 2009 on TF1. In Belgium, the series has been broadcast on RTBF since May 25, 2013.

Background 

The series relates the investigations of Chloé Saint-Laurent then Adèle Delettre, two psychologists specialized in criminology. Their exceptional experience and sensitivity allow them to decipher the state of mind of murderers as victims, thus enabling investigators from the 3rd Division of the Judicial Police (DPJ) in Paris to solve the most disturbing cases.

Cast

External links 
 Profilage's website on TF1 
 

2000s crime drama television series
2009 French television series debuts
French police procedural television series